Silas McKinnie (born January 24, 1946) is an American-born Canadian football player who played professionally for the Saskatchewan Roughriders and Calgary Stampeders.

References

1946 births
Living people
Saskatchewan Roughriders players
Calgary Stampeders players
Iowa Hawkeyes football players
Canadian football running backs